Robert C. (Bob) Gaddis (born January 20, 1952 in Jackson, Mississippi) is a former professional American football wide receiver. He was the 13th round draft pick (#337 overall) of the Pittsburgh Steelers in the 1975 NFL Draft. He would play wide receiver with the Buffalo Bills in 1976 and then five seasons in the CFL for three teams. He won a Grey Cup championship in 1977 as a member of the Montreal Alouettes.

References

1952 births
Living people
American football wide receivers
Canadian football wide receivers
Buffalo Bills players
Montreal Alouettes players
Players of American football from Jackson, Mississippi
Players of Canadian football from Jackson, Mississippi
Toronto Argonauts players
Winnipeg Blue Bombers players
Mississippi Valley State Delta Devils football players